Hatori (written: 葉鳥 or 羽鳥) is a Japanese surname. Notable people with the surname include:

 (born 1975), Japanese manga artist
 (born 1970), Japanese singer-songwriter and musician

See also
, a train station in Omitama, Ibaraki Prefecture, Japan
, a dam in Fukushima Prefecture, Japan
Hattori

Japanese-language surnames